Donald McNabb (February 1870 – June 18, 1934) was a politician from Alberta, Canada.

In 1890 he helped form a committee to raise money to buy books, periodicals and furnishings for the Miner's Library in Lethbridge.

McNabb was the first member of a third party to be elected to the Legislative Assembly of Alberta serving as a Labor member. He was elected in the by-election for Lethbridge in 1909.

During his time in the Legislative Assembly he accomplished another first in Alberta. Bill 8 An Act to amend the Lethbridge Charter was the first introduced from the opposition and a third party to receive Royal Assent in the legislature. He also introduced a second bill in the same legislative sitting to get assent, Bill 10 An Act respecting the Galt Hospital.
 
McNabb ran for re-election in the new Lethbridge City riding, but was defeated.

In 1912, he chaired the meeting that formed the Alberta Federation of Labour.

External links
Miners Library Lethbridge
1905 1st Legislature 4th Session List of Bills

1870 births
1934 deaths
Dominion Labor Party (Alberta) MLAs